Anabarilius paucirastellus is a species of ray-finned fish in the genus Alburnus.

References

 

paucirastellus
Fish described in 1988